24 Carat Gold is a best-of album by German techno group Scooter, featuring 24 gold-selling songs from 1994 until its release date on 4 November 2002. Many of the songs on the album are digitally remastered versions, with some of the songs being shortened as to fit all of the tracks on the album. The album's track list is chronologically backwards in the sense that "Nessaja" was the latest single release while "Hyper Hyper" was their first commercially successful single to be released.

Track listing

Charts

References

External links
 Official Scooter Site

Scooter (band) albums
2002 compilation albums